Whitney Allison (née Schultz; born March 1, 1988) is an American former road racing cyclist and current off-road cyclist, who competes in gravel bike racing for Bike Sports.

See also
 List of 2016 UCI Women's Teams and riders

References

External links
 

1988 births
Living people
American female cyclists
Place of birth missing (living people)
21st-century American women